Grodnensky Uyezd (Гродненский уезд) was one of the subdivisions of the Grodno Governorate of the Russian Empire. It was situated in the northern part of the governorate. Its administrative centre was Grodno.

Demographics
At the time of the Russian Empire Census of 1897, Grodnensky Uyezd had a population of 204,854. Of these, 65.7% spoke Belarusian, 19.9% Yiddish, 6.2% Russian, 5.7% Polish, 1.4% Lithuanian, 0.4% Tatar, 0.3% German, 0.1% Chuvash and 0.1% Mari as their native language.

References

 
Uezds of Grodno Governorate
Grodno Governorate